Lord John Philip Sackville (22 June 1713 – 3 December 1765) was the second son of Lionel Sackville, 1st Duke of Dorset. He was a keen cricketer who was closely connected with the sport in Kent.

He was Member of Parliament (MP) for Tamworth from 1734 to 1747.

Cricket career
Sackville was first recorded as a cricketer in 1734 when he and his brother, Lord Middlesex, played for a Kent side against one from Sussex at Sevenoaks Vine. In August 1735, Sackville captained Kent to victory against Sir William Gage's Sussex side on the same ground. He became the main patron of the Kent team and captained the side in many matches until 1745, but he is not mentioned after that. In 1739, he played for London Cricket Club.

In 1744 Sackville challenged an England side to play against his team. Kent won, in part thanks to Sackville himself taking a catch to dismiss Richard Newland. The catch was eulogised in Cricket, An Heroic Poem (1745) by James Love. The match details were recorded and preserved in what is now cricket's second oldest known scorecard.

Family and personal life
Sackville was a notorious rake in his youth. He was compelled to marry Lady Frances Leveson-Gower, daughter of John Leveson-Gower, 1st Earl Gower and sister of the Duchess of Bedford in 1744, after she gave birth to his child at Woburn. They eventually had two sons and one daughter. The couple's parents were furious, and the Prince of Wales compensated Sackville for any loss of income, making him a lord of his bedchamber in 1745, and thus securing him as a recruit to his party.

Two of Sackville's children were:

 John Frederick Sackville, 3rd Duke of Dorset (25 March 1745 – 19 July 1799).
 Mary Sackville (b. 1 April 1746). Married Sackville Tufton, 8th Earl of Thanet in 1767.

Sackville was also disappointed when Lord Wilmington the late Prime Minister (d. 1743) declined to leave him his Sussex estates, worth £3-£4,000 a year. It is not clear if Wilmington's decision was made because of Sackville's messy private life, or his political inconstancy. Commissioned a captain in the 37th Regiment of Foot in 1734, he became a captain and lieutenant-colonel in the 2nd Regiment of Foot Guards on 1 May 1740. He disgraced himself by deserting from the Guards when they were sent on foreign service in 1746, and was forced to leave the Army in September. Finally, he was committed to a private lunatic asylum circa 1746, then sent abroad to exile on a very small allowance in Lausanne where Lord Shelburne met him in 1760, and commented on his dirty condition but lucid conversation.

According to his descendant Robert Sackville-West, 7th Baron Sackville in his book Inheritance he became insane later in life, dying in Geneva, Switzerland, aged 52. However, his brother lived long enough to allow John Philip's son to inherit his title and become the next Duke of Dorset.

References

Bibliography
 F S Ashley-Cooper, At the Sign of the Wicket: Cricket 1742–1751, Cricket Magazine, 1900
 G B Buckley, Fresh Light on 18th Century Cricket, Cotterell, 1935
 Arthur Haygarth, Scores & Biographies, Volume 1 (1744–1826), Lillywhite, 1862
 Timothy J McCann, Sussex Cricket in the Eighteenth Century, Sussex Record Society, 2004
 H T Waghorn, Cricket Scores, Notes, etc. (1730–1773), Blackwood, 1899

External links
SACKVILLE, Lord John Philip (1713–65 Published in The History of Parliament: the House of Commons 1715–1754, ed. R. Sedgwick, 1970.

1713 births
1765 deaths
Cricket patrons
English cricketers
English cricketers of 1701 to 1786
Kent cricketers
Younger sons of dukes
Members of the Parliament of Great Britain for English constituencies
British MPs 1734–1741
British MPs 1741–1747
John
18th-century philanthropists
37th Regiment of Foot officers
Coldstream Guards officers